Greatest Hits, Vol. 1 is Rod Stewart's 1979 Warner Bros. Records best-of compilation.

Track listing
 "Hot Legs" (Rod Stewart, Gary Grainger)
 "Maggie May" (Rod Stewart; Martin Quittenton)
 "Da Ya Think I'm Sexy?" (Rod Stewart; Carmine Appice)
 "You're in My Heart (The Final Acclaim)" (Rod Stewart)
 "Sailing" (Gavin Sutherland)
 "I Don't Want to Talk About It" (Danny Whitten)
 "Tonight's the Night (Gonna Be Alright)" (Rod Stewart)
 "The Killing of Georgie (Part I and II)" (Rod Stewart)
 "The First Cut Is the Deepest" (Cat Stevens)
 "I Was Only Joking" (Rod Stewart; Gary Grainger)

Charts

Weekly charts

Year-end charts

Certifications

References

1979 greatest hits albums
Rod Stewart compilation albums
Warner Records compilation albums